Jody Santos is an author, journalist and documentary filmmaker. She has reported for television and print news for the last 20 years, and has been producing and directing documentaries for PBS and cable networks like Discovery Health  and the Hallmark Channel  since 2000. She has traveled to more than a dozen countries across five continents, documenting everything from the trafficking of girls in Nepal to the reproductive rights of women in Ghana. Her book, Daring to Feel: Violence, the News Media and Their Emotions, was released by Rowman & Littlefield  in December 2009, and in paperback by Lexington Books in October 2010.

Regardless of the medium, Santos's goal has remained the same: to shed light on the social injustices of the day. Her reports often focus on the issue of violence against women and children and ways to prevent violence in our communities. As a special projects producer for Boston’s NBC news affiliate, she was nominated for an Emmy in 2001 for a special report on an effort to rid the city’s streets of black market guns. In June 2015, she won a Telly Award in film/video in the social responsibility category  for her public television documentary No One Left Behind.

Over the years, Santos has appeared on National Public Radio, Unsolved Mysteries  and other news outlets to defend her writings and weigh in on important current events. She is an associate professor of communications at Springfield College in Western Massachusetts.

References

External links 
http://www.jodysantos.com
http://www.telegram.com/apps/pbcs.dll/article?AID=/20080313/NEWS/803130745/1008/NEWS02

American women journalists
Living people
Year of birth missing (living people)
21st-century American women